Wacław Babiński(April 3, 1887 in Warsaw, Congress Poland–July 22, 1957 in Montreal, Canada) was a Polish diplomat and professor at the University of Montreal.

Babiński started his diplomatic career while in Paris when the Polish government asked him to set up the Polish consulate in France. He was appointed ambassador of Poland to Yugoslavia from 1929 to 1931 and The Hague from 1931 to 1939. During World War II, he was the Canadian delegate of the Polish government-in-exile in London. 
After the war, along with Polkowski, Waclaw Babinski played a key role in hiding treasures of the royal collection of the Wawel Castle from the communists. Waclaw Babinski retired and died in Montreal, Canada in 1957.

Education 
He finished his PhD in Economics at Munich University.

Family 
He was the son of Leon Babinski (1860–1932) and Stefania Karpinska (1866–1939). He had two siblings: Witold (1897–1985) and Leon Wladislaw (1891–1973). Waclaw Babinski married Maria Wodzińska (1894–1975) and had three children: Wanda (1917–1994), Ryszard (1931-) and Stanislaw (1920–1990).

History 
Coat of Arms Bojcza.

References 

1887 births
1957 deaths
Ambassadors of Poland to Yugoslavia
Ambassadors of Poland to the Netherlands
Ludwig Maximilian University of Munich alumni
Diplomats from Warsaw
People from Warsaw Governorate
Polish exiles
Polish emigrants to Canada